The 1989 Czechoslovak motorcycle Grand Prix was the penultimate round of the 1989 Grand Prix motorcycle racing season. It took place on the weekend of 25–27 August 1989 at the Masaryk Circuit located in Brno, Czechoslovakia.

500 cc race report
8th pole position for Kevin Schwantz, with Eddie Lawson behind. Wayne Gardner crashes in practice and is unable to make the start.

Despite Schwantz' poles, more often than not it's Wayne Rainey who gets the start, today being followed by Lawson, Schwantz, Christian Sarron, Pierfrancesco Chili, Kevin Magee.

Schwantz gets past Lawson and Rainey for the lead, while Sarron settles into fourth with a growing gap back to fifth place.

Lawson passes Rainey for second and then gets past Schwantz for the lead. The battle for fifth is split between Ron Haslam, Chili and Magee.

Lawson and Schwantz leave Rainey behind as they start to encounter back-marker traffic. Lawson need only finish just behind Rainey in the remaining two races, but it looks like he wants the win today, staying fast enough to keep Schwantz behind him for a little, until Schwantz overtakes again.

Niall Mackenzie moves up to fifth spot, ahead of Haslam, and Chili.

Making it look easy, Schwantz drops Lawson, who's fighting for grip a good ways back. Further back, Rainey is caught by Sarron, but team orders prevail as Rainey is allowed to stay in third spot. The podium is Schwantz, Lawson and Rainey, the last now 15.5 points behind Lawson in the standings.

500 cc classification

References

Czech Republic motorcycle Grand Prix
Czechoslovak
Motorcycle Grand Prix